Marijan Beneš (11 June 1951 – 4 September 2018) was a Yugoslav boxer from Banja Luka, Bosnia and Herzegovina. He is considered one of the best boxers in Yugoslav history. After a brilliant amateur career, culminating in the gold medal in European Amateur Boxing Championships in Belgrade, he turned professional in 1977, and won the European Boxing Union title in the light welterweights in 1979. Next year he fought for the WBA World super welterweight title but lost to title holder Ayub Kalule on points.
Beneš withdrew from the ring in 1983, after a severe eye injury. In 2020 he was named as the best Bosnian boxer in 20th century.

Biography
Beneš was born in Belgrade to Croat father Josip and Serb mother Marija (née Vukić). Under the influence of his father, a music teacher, Beneš played piano and violin in his childhood. He had three brothers and one sister. He spent his childhood in Tuzla. Marijan was one of the famous four Beneš brothers (Antun, Ivica, Josip, Marijan) that competed for Sloboda Tuzla. His life took a radical turn when he (allegedly) entered the ring in Tuzla at the age of 10 and won against an 18-year-old opponent. His first coaches were Bego Huseljić and Miloš Todorović. When he was 16, he left Bokserski klub Sloboda Tuzla and joined Bokserski klub Slavija in Banja Luka, where he would stay during his entire amateur career.

Beneš described himself as being staunchly opposed to "Greater Serbs" and "Greater Croats", maintaining a Yugoslav identity.

Career
During his amateur career, Beneš won nine titles in Bosnia, four titles of Yugoslav champion, and a number of other competitions. In 1973, he won the European title in light welterweight in Belgrade and he received the "Golden Badge", an award for the Best Athlete of the year in Yugoslavia. Soon after he caught hepatitis, which could have meant the end of the career. "Radically stubborn" (as he said himself), and devoted to boxing, he decided to continue. He also participated in the 1976 Montreal Olympics, but lost in the second round.

Highlights

 1973 European championships, Belgrade, Yugoslavia, 
Light welterweight
 1/8: Defeated Neville Cole (England) TKO 2
 1/4: Defeated Paul Dobrescu (Romania) TKO 2
 1/2: Defeated Ulrich Beyer (East Germany) TKOI 2
 Finals: Defeated Anatoli Kamnev (Soviet Union) TKOI 2

 1973 Balkan Championships, Athens, Greece
Light welterweight
 1/2: Defeated Calistrat Cutov (Romania) 3:2
 Finals: Defeated Athanasios Iliadis (Greece) 5:0

 1976 Balkan Championships, Zagreb, Yugoslavia
Welterweight
 1/4: Defeated Sabahattin Burcu (Turkey) 5:0
 1/2: Defeated Viktor Tushev (Bulgaria) 5:0
 Finals: Defeated Vasile Cicu (Romania) 5:0

He turned professional in 1977, rising quickly to the European top. On 17 March 1979, in his hometown Banja Luka, he won the EBU title knocking down the defender, French boxer Gilbert Cohen, in the fourth round. He defended the title successfully four times, and lost on points in 1980 to then WBA world junior middleweight champion Ayub Kalule, for the WBA's world championship in a match regarded as one of toughest in Denmark ever. He eventually lost the EBU crown to Louis Acaries in 1981.

A severe injury of his left eye effectively sealed his career. It is not exactly known which match caused it; by one account, it was a match with Luigi Minchillo in 1983, and by another, it originated from the 1979 match with Sandy Torres in Zenica, and the condition worsened since. During the career, he had a number of other injuries: 26 bone fractures and damaged vocal cords, that caused him to speak quietly and slowly.  He withdrew from the ring in 1983, fighting only two more exhibition matches in 1990s. The ring injury eventually left Beneš blind in his left eye.

After boxing and death
Beneš's brother was killed in 1992, during the Bosnian War. Beneš also participated in the war. At the end of the war in 1995, he was forced to leave Banja Luka after a number of threats. He sold his possessions cheaply, and during the war he stayed in Medulin and Zagreb, in Croatia, in poverty. He divorced his wife Stana, who moved to Niš, Serbia, with their daughters Žanet and Marijana. As he put it, "everything turned around; people started hating each other overnight…there are great people, but the war helped me realize who is the real people and who is scum."  He returned to Banja Luka in 1996, after the end of the war, continuing to live modestly. "I lived in Croatia, people respected me, but I'm used to the old friends".

In 2004, a documentary film of Beneš's life, titled Bio jednom jedan šampion (Once Upon a Time There Was a Champion) was recorded in the production of Independent Television Banja Luka. Despite modest ambitions, it toured all over the former Yugoslavia, and Beneš was frequent guest on promotions.

Beneš lived the rest of his life in Banja Luka under modest circumstances, mostly financed by his sister Ljiljana. He published a book of poems Druga strana medalje (Another Side of Coin), devoted to sports, and he said that he had written a dozen more, and that he planned to publish them. Despite regular physical activity and a healthy diet, his boxing career and advanced age caused some health complications. In 2017, Beneš had Alzheimer's disease and was a wheelchair user.  He died on 4 September 2018 at the age of 67.

Boxing record as a professional

|-
|align="center" colspan=8|32 Wins (21 knockouts, 11 decisions), 6 Losses (3 knockouts, 3 decisions), 1 Draw
|-
| align="center" style="border-style: none none solid solid; background: #e3e3e3"|Result
| align="center" style="border-style: none none solid solid; background: #e3e3e3"|Record
| align="center" style="border-style: none none solid solid; background: #e3e3e3"|Opponent
| align="center" style="border-style: none none solid solid; background: #e3e3e3"|Type
| align="center" style="border-style: none none solid solid; background: #e3e3e3"|Round
| align="center" style="border-style: none none solid solid; background: #e3e3e3"|Date
| align="center" style="border-style: none none solid solid; background: #e3e3e3"|Location
| align="center" style="border-style: none none solid solid; background: #e3e3e3"|Notes
|-align=center
|Win
|
|align=left|Cliff McCourry
|KO
|2
|02/02/1997
|align=left| Požega, Croatia
|align=left|
|-
|Win
|
|align=left| Salvatore Di Salvatore
|TKO
|5
|03/05/1991
|align=left| Banja Luka, Yugoslavia
|align=left|
|-
|Win
|
|align=left| Maurice Bufi
|KO
|6
|02/12/1983
|align=left| Hanns-Martin-Schleyer-Halle, Stuttgart, West Germany
|align=left|
|-
|Loss
|
|align=left| Johnny Heard
|KO
|1
|16/04/1983
|align=left| Salzburg, Austria
|align=left|
|-
|Win
|
|align=left| Mbayo Wa Mbayo
|RTD
|6
|31/03/1983
|align=left| Split, Yugoslavia
|align=left|
|-
|Win
|
|align=left| Darwin Brewster
|PTS
|10
|27/01/1983
|align=left| Rijeka, Yugoslavia
|align=left|
|-
|Loss
|
|align=left| Luigi Minchillo
|MD
|12
|28/10/1982
|align=left| San Severo, Italy
|align=left|
|-
|Win
|
|align=left| Gordie Lawson
|KO
|4
|10/06/1982
|align=left| Titograd, Yugoslavia
|align=left|
|-
|Win
|
|align=left|Tony Desroche
|KO
|2
|09/03/1982
|align=left| Sarajevo, Yugoslavia
|align=left|
|-
|Win
|
|align=left| Randy Milton
|KO
|1
|19/12/1981
|align=left| Split, Yugoslavia
|align=left|
|-
|Win
|
|align=left| Franz Dorfer
|TKO
|4
|06/11/1981
|align=left| Vienna, Austria
|align=left|
|-
|Win
|
|align=left| Andre Mongelema
|PTS
|10
|18/09/1981
|align=left| Vienna, Austria
|align=left|
|-
|Loss
|
|align=left| Louis Acaries
|PTS
|12
|19/03/1981
|align=left| Paris, France
|align=left|
|-
|Win
|
|align=left| Antonio Alejandro Garrido
|TKO
|9
|09/02/1981
|align=left| Vienna, Austria
|align=left|
|-
|Win
|
|align=left| Sandy Torres
|PTS
|10
|20/12/1980
|align=left| Split, Yugoslavia
|align=left|
|-
|Win
|
|align=left| Georges Warusfel
|TKO
|5
|06/10/1980
|align=left| Paris, France
|align=left|
|-
|Loss
|
|align=left| Ayub Kalule
|UD
|15
|12/06/1980
|align=left| Randers Hallen, Randers, Denmark
|align=left|
|-
|Win
|
|align=left| Freddie Boynton
|KO
|3
|28/03/1980
|align=left| Berlin, West Germany
|align=left|
|-
|Draw
|
|align=left| Damiano Lassandro
|PTS
|12
|13/02/1980
|align=left| Pesaro, Italy
|align=left|
|-
|Win
|
|align=left| Adrie Huussen
|TKO
|3
|05/11/1979
|align=left| Rotterdam Ahoy Sportpaleis, Rotterdam, Netherlands
|align=left|
|-
|Loss
|
|align=left| Sandy Torres
|TKO
|6
|25/08/1979
|align=left| Zenica, Yugoslavia
|align=left|
|-
|Win
|
|align=left| Andoni Amana
|TKO
|8
|06/06/1979
|align=left| Bilbao, Spain
|align=left|
|-
|Win
|
|align=left| Zip Castillo
|KO
|1
|28/04/1979
|align=left| Belgrade, Yugoslavia
|align=left|
|-
|Win
|
|align=left| Gilbert Cohen
|KO
|4
|17/03/1979
|align=left| Banja Luka, Yugoslavia
|align=left|
|-
|Win
|
|align=left| Everaldo Costa Azevedo
|PTS
|10
|18/11/1978
|align=left| Berlin, West Germany
|align=left|
|-
|Win
|
|align=left| Elisha Obed
|PTS
|10
|02/09/1978
|align=left| Berlin, West Germany
|align=left|
|-
|Win
|
|align=left| Tiger Quaye
|PTS
|8
|29/05/1978
|align=left| Rotterdam Ahoy Sportpaleis, Rotterdam, Netherlands
|align=left|
|-
|Win
|
|align=left| Peter "Cricket" Neal
|KO
|5
|06/05/1978
|align=left| Frankfurt, West Germany
|align=left|
|-
|Win
|
|align=left| Tiger Quaye
|KO
|1
|07/04/1978
|align=left| Berlin, West Germany
|align=left|
|-
|Loss
|
|align=left| Tiger Quaye
|TKO
|3
|15/02/1978
|align=left| Rotterdam Ahoy Sportpaleis, Rotterdam, Netherlands
|align=left|
|-
|Win
|
|align=left| Pat Thomas
|PTS
|8
|16/01/1978
|align=left| Rotterdam, Netherlands
|align=left|
|-
|Win
|
|align=left| Wa Bukasa
|KO
|3
|16/12/1977
|align=left| Vienna, Austria
|align=left|
|-
|Win
|
|align=left| Steve Angell
|TKO
|4
|10/12/1977
|align=left| Berlin, West Germany
|align=left|
|-
|Win
|
|align=left| Alain Ruocco
|PTS
|8
|18/11/1977
|align=left| Vienna, Austria
|align=left|
|-
|Win
|
|align=left| Mick Minter
|TKO
|2
|31/10/1977
|align=left| Rotterdam Ahoy Sportpaleis, Rotterdam, Netherlands
|align=left|
|-
|Win
|
|align=left| Scottish John Smith
|PTS
|8
|10/10/1977
|align=left| Rotterdam Ahoy Sportpaleis, Rotterdam, Netherlands
|align=left|
|-
|Win
|
|align=left| Rhida Hakima
|KO
|2
|01/10/1977
|align=left| Vienna, Austria
|align=left|
|-
|Win
|
|align=left| Pascal Zito
|PTS
|6
|24/09/1977
|align=left| Vienna, Austria
|align=left|
|-
|Win
|
|align=left| Clement Tshinza
|PTS
|4
|06/08/1977
|align=left| Deutschlandhalle, Charlottenburg, West Germany
|align=left|
|}

See also
Mate Parlov

References

External links

 

Sportspeople from Belgrade
Bosnia and Herzegovina male boxers
Croatian male boxers
Light-welterweight boxers
Welterweight boxers
Olympic boxers of Yugoslavia
Boxers at the 1976 Summer Olympics
1951 births
2018 deaths
Serbian people of Croatian descent
Yugoslav male boxers
Sportspeople with a vision impairment